This is a list of Members of Parliament elected in the 1953 Northern Ireland general election.

All members of the Northern Ireland House of Commons elected at the 1953 Northern Ireland general election are listed.

Members

Changes
8 May 1954: Harry West elected for the Unionists in Enniskillen, following the death of Thomas Charles Nelson.
15 October 1955: Isaac Hawthorne elected for the Unionists in Central Armagh, following the death of George Dougan.
15 November 1955: Neville Martin elected for the Unionists in Belfast Woodvale, following the resignation of Robert Harcourt.
23 November 1956: Herbert Victor Kirk elected for the Unionists in Belfast Windsor, following the resignation of Archibald Wilson.
4 December 1956: William Fitzsimmons elected for the Unionists in Belfast Duncairn, following the resignation of George Boyle Hanna.
29 April 1957: Death of Harry Midgley.
30 October 1957: Death of William McCleery.

References
Biographies of Members of the Northern Ireland House of Commons

1953